The Delaware Art Museum is an art museum located on the Kentmere Parkway in Wilmington, Delaware, which holds a collection of more than 12,000 objects. The museum was founded in 1912 as the Wilmington Society of the Fine Arts in honor of the artist Howard Pyle. The collection focuses on American art and illustration from the 19th to the 21st century, and on the English Pre-Raphaelite Brotherhood movement of the mid-19th century.

The museum building was expanded and renovated in 2005 and includes a  Sculpture Park, the Helen Farr Sloan Library and Archives, studio art classes, a children's learning area, as well as a cafe and museum store.

History
The museum was founded in 1912 after Howard Pyle's death as the Wilmington Society of the Fine Arts (WSFA), with over 100 paintings, drawings, and prints purchased from Pyle's widow Anne. Pyle was the best-known American illustrator of his day; he died unexpectedly in 1911 while on a trip to Italy.  

Pyle left behind many students and patrons in his home town of Wilmington who wished to honor his memory through the museum, including Frank Schoonover, Stanley Arthurs, and Louisa du Pont Copeland. The museum's charter stated its purpose "to promote the knowledge and enjoyment of and cultivation in the fine arts in the State of Delaware."

From 1912 to 1922, the WSFA did not have a permanent home. It held annual exhibitions at the Hotel duPont of work by Pyle, as well as juried exhibitions of his pupils and other Delaware artists. The Pyle Collection continued to grow due to the largess of Willard S. Morse, who gave over 100 Pyle pen and ink drawings to the WSFA between 1915 and 1919. In 1922, the WSFA rented three rooms in the New Library Building on the corner of 10th and Market Streets in downtown Wilmington.

In 2005, the DAM took out a $24.8 million loan in the form of tax-exempt bonds (to be repaid by 2037) in order to finance an ambitious $32.5 million doubling in size of its building. During the 2008 financial crisis, its endowment dropped from $33 million to $21 million. In response, the museum sold $30 million worth of art from its collection in order to repay its loans and increase its endowment, a move that brought sanctions from the Association of Art Museum Directors.

Bancroft donation

In 1931, the estate of Samuel Bancroft contacted the WSFA with an offer to donate a collection of Pre-Raphaelite works, along with 11 acres of land to house a museum for the collection.  Bancroft acquired the collection beginning in the 1890s and it is the "largest and most important collection of British Pre-Raphaelite art and manuscript materials in the United States." Despite the hardships of the Great Depression, the WSFA raised $350,000 for the new building which opened in 1938.  At the same time, the name was changed to Delaware Art Center.

Expansion
The WSFA moved into the Delaware Art Center in June 1938, with the Wilmington Academy of Fine Arts running educational programs on the ground floor.  The onset of World War II resulted in strict gas rationing, which drastically reduced the attendance to the museum.  The Wilmington Academy of Fine Arts disbanded in 1943 and turned its assets over to the Delaware Art Center,  forming the basis of its education department, which grew to more than 500 students by 1954.

The rapid growth of educational programs after World War II required the Delaware Art Center to expand by 1956.  Studios and training facilities were included in the expansion, thanks to a $300,000 donation by H. Fletcher Brown. A further renovation was completed in 1970, adding air conditioning and humidity control to the building.  In 1972, the Delaware Art Center was awarded accreditation by the American Alliance of Museums.  Shortly thereafter, the Delaware Art Center was renamed the Delaware Art Museum to "reflect the growing strength of its collections, programs, and constituency."

A further expansion was completed in 1987 which effectively doubled the size of the museum.  However, the rapid growth of attendance, programming, and outreach required a further expansion in 2005. During the expansion, the museum hosted programming at what is now the Chase Center on the Riverfront.

Collections
The Delaware Art Museum's collections are predominantly drawn from late 19th- and early 20th-century American illustration, as well as works from the Pre-Raphaelite Brotherhood.  The basis of the museum's collections are the works of Howard Pyle and his pupils N.C. Wyeth, Frank Schoonover, and Stanley Arthurs.  Helen Farr Sloan was the wife of artist John French Sloan, and she began donations in 1961 that eventually totalled 5,000 objects.

Since the 1970s, the museum has added works by modern artists such as Jacob Lawrence, Louise Nevelson, Robert Motherwell, George Segal, and Jim Dine. The permanent collections at the museum include the following:

Pre-Raphaelite Collection

The Samuel and Mary R. Bancroft Pre-Raphaelite Collection, including works by:
Ford Madox Brown
Edward Burne-Jones
Julia Margaret Cameron
Walter Crane
Kate Greenaway
William Holman Hunt
John Everett Millais
Albert Joseph Moore
William Morris
Dante Gabriel Rossetti
Frederick Sandys
Elizabeth Siddal
Simeon Solomon
Marie Spartali Stillman
George Frederic Watts

19th Century American art
American Art of the 19th Century, including works by:
Jefferson David Chalfant
Frederic Edwin Church
Thomas Dewing
Winslow Homer
George Inness
Raphaelle Peale
Severin Roesen
Augustus Saint-Gaudens
John Henry Twachtman

American illustration

Howard Pyle and his students
From the "Golden Age of Illustration":
Howard Pyle
Frank Schoonover
N.C. Wyeth

Other American illustration
Including works by:
Charles Dana Gibson
Elizabeth Shippen Green
John Held, Jr.
J. C. Leyendecker
Thomas Nast
Coles Phillips

American art of the early 20th Century

 Ashcan School (The Eight), including works by:
John Sloan
Robert Henri
George Luks
 Other artists, including works by:
Charles E. Burchfield
Lydia Field Emmet
John D. Graham
Marsden Hartley
Edward Hopper
Jacob Lawrence
Paul Manship
Reginald Marsh
William Zorach

Post-World War II American art
Including works by:
Deborah Butterfield
Grace Hartigan
Al Held
Robert Indiana
Edward L. Loper, Sr.
David Lund
Louise Nevelson
Mark Tobey
Andrew Wyeth

Helen Farr Sloan Library

Two separate libraries opened in the new Delaware Art Center building in 1938: one centered on the collection of Howard Pyle, and the other centering on Samuel Bancroft, Jr. and his collections of Victorian books and books on Pre-Raphaelite painting.  In 1978 Helen Farr Sloan donated the collections of her husband, the John Sloan Manuscript and Library Collection.  A consolidated library opened in 1985 in the new Pamela and Lammot du Pont Copeland wing and was named in honor of Mrs. Sloan.  It contains over 30,000 volumes and 1,000 boxes of personal papers, photographs and other material related to John Sloan, Samuel Bancroft, Jr. and Howard Pyle and his students. It recently acquired a copy of The Flower Book by Edward Burne-Jones.  In 2009, the museum received the M.G. Sawyer Collection of Decorative Bindings, which contains over 2,000 volumes.

Copeland Sculpture Garden

The nine acre sculpture garden behind the museum includes nine large sculptures and an old reservoir converted into a labyrinth.

Highlights include the 13-foot-tall bronze Crying Giant by Tom Otterness and Three Rectangles Horizontal Jointed Gyratory III by George Rickey, which moves in the wind.
Joe Moss is represented by a sound sculpture which modifies and distorts nearby sounds.

Exhibitions
The museum presents about ten special exhibitions each year with topics ranging from nationally known modern artists to historical Delaware folk art.  Since 2009 the exhibitions have included the works of Leonard Baskin, Delaware photographer 	
Fred Comegys, Harold Eugene Edgerton, James Gurney, May Morris, Maxfield Parrish, Ellen Bernard Thompson Pyle, Frank Schoonover, and John Sloan, as well as works from the collection of the Royal Holloway, University of London, and African American Art from the American Folk Art Museum.

Exhibitions have also included the works of Mary Page Evans, Howard Pyle, Katharine Pyle, and Katharine Richardson Wireman, as well as The Flower Book by Edward Burne-Jones.

Studio art education
The museum offers about 100 programs each year, ranging from 8-week classes to 1-day workshops, as well as open studios.  Special classes are offered to adults, teenagers, and children in areas including drawing, painting, photography, jewelry making, and ceramics.

See also

 List of museums in Delaware
 Delaware Center for the Contemporary Arts
 Paul R. Jones Collection of African American Art

Artworks
 Found (Rossetti)
 Lady Lilith
 Love's Messenger, by Marie Spartali Stillman, 1885
 Mary Magdalene (Sandys)
 Mnemosyne (Rossetti)
 Veronica Veronese

References

External links
 
 The Samuel and Mary R. Bancroft Collection of Pre-Raphaelite Art
 Brandywine 10
 First for Friday, Howard Pyle and the Delaware Art Museum, WHYY-TV, November 4, 2011, video 28:50 minutes.
 Where In Wilmington – Delaware Art Museum – March 2008, a joint production of the City Council and the Mayor's office in Wilmington, DE, video 5:23 minutes.
Delaware Art Museum within Google Arts & Culture

 
1912 establishments in Delaware
Art museums established in 1912
Art museums and galleries in Delaware
Institutions accredited by the American Alliance of Museums
Museums in Wilmington, Delaware
Brandywine Museums & Gardens Alliance
Museums of American art